(born 5 January 1915) is a Japanese field hockey player who competed in the 1936 Summer Olympics.

In the 1936 tournament he played all three matches as forward for the Japanese field hockey team, when they were eliminated after the group stage.

External links
part 6 the field hockey tournament
Takeo Ito's profile at Sports Reference.com
 

1915 births
Japanese male field hockey players
Olympic field hockey players of Japan
Field hockey players at the 1936 Summer Olympics